Baku Crystal Hall (Azerbaijani: Bakı Kristal Zalı) is an indoor arena in Baku, Azerbaijan. Located on the coast of Baku near National Flag Square, construction of the arena began in August 2011 and finished in April 2012in time for it to host its first major event, the Eurovision Song Contest 2012.

History

Baku Crystal Hall was built in order to host the Eurovision Song Contest 2012. On 2 August 2011, the main agreement was signed with Alpine Bau Deutschland AG to construct the venue and preparations for construction had been started in the area. Even though the full cost of the contract was not named, the government allocated 6 million AZN for the construction of the venue. On 5 September 2011, it was announced that the venue will hold 25,000 spectators. The arena also contains VIP lounges.

The construction of the arena was expected to be completed by 31 March 2012. However, there was a delay of three weeks because of weather conditions, and the building was announced to have been completed on 16 April 2012. Baku Crystal Hall was opened on 7 May 2012 by the President of Azerbaijan Ilham Aliyev and First Lady Mehriban Aliyeva.

Structure and facilities

The total area of the complex is 30,958 m2, while the area of the arena is 10,964 m2. Its height in the middle is 24 m. The arena is lit by 12,000 LED light points with a lighting rate of 850 lux at 1 m height. The corridor around the arena is divided into two symmetrical parts with 15 entrances on each side, including 30 outside entrances. Each sector has 2 transport access points (1 on each side), 10 arena entrances (5 on each side) and 16 tribune access points (8 on each side). Along the corridor, there are 10 beverage facilities (5 in each sector), 18 catering facilities (9 in each sector), 2 first aid points (1 in each sector), 36 toilets (6 for men, 6 for women and 6 for persons with physical disabilities in each sector). The hall has 12,000 seats but can accommodate 27,000 people.

The building has a crystalline shape and illuminated façade with numerous LED lights. Its shape and façade are response to Azerbaijan's special request for the creation of a widely visible and visually effective landmark as a bridge between Asia and Europe that will be noticed in an international context. The LED lights were upgraded to allow different dynamic lighting scenarios to appear in order to highlight the membrane façade and create moods appropriate for the different stages of the events.

Usage

Concerts
Baku Crystal Hall's first major event was the 2012 Eurovision Song Contest, held at the arena from 22 May to 26 May 2012. Jennifer Lopez, Shakira and Rihanna performed concerts at Baku Crystal Hall later in 2012. Local singer Aygün Kazımova had a concert on 22 September 2017. Christina Aguilera performed a sold-out concert on April 28, 2018. On 28 May 2018, a gala concert to celebrate the 100th anniversary of the establishment of the Azerbaijan Democratic Republic was held in Crystal Hall.

Culture
Baku Crystal Hall hosted the 6th e-Sports World Championship held by the International e-Sports Federation in November 2014.

Sports
Baku Crystal Hall hosted boxing, karate, taekwondo, fencing and volleyball (indoor) events during the inaugural 2015 European Games.

Gallery

References

External links 

  
 Baku Crystal Hall on the website of constructor Alpine Bau

Music venues completed in 2012
Sports venues completed in 2012
Sports venues in Baku
Music venues in Azerbaijan
Indoor arenas in Azerbaijan
2012 establishments in Azerbaijan
Tourist attractions in Baku
Gerkan, Marg and Partners buildings
Volleyball venues in Azerbaijan
Handball venues in Azerbaijan
2015 European Games venues